Monroe Township is one of twelve townships in Clark County, Indiana. As of the 2010 census, its population was 5,402 and it contained 2,125 housing units.

History
Monroe Township was organized prior to 1827 but the exact date is unclear because records have been lost. It was likely named for President James Monroe.

Geography

Unincorporated towns
 Blue Lick
 Henryville
 Underwood

Adjacent townships
 Vienna Township, Scott County (north)
 Oregon Township (east)
 Charlestown Township (southeast)
 Union Township (south)
 Carr Township (southwest)
 Wood Township (southwest)
 Polk Township, Washington County (west)
 Finley Township, Scott County (northwest)

Major highways
  Interstate 65
  U.S. Route 31
  State Road 160

Cemeteries
The township contains several cemeteries: Blue Lick Cemetery (a.k.a. Mountain Grove), Bowerman Cemetery, Cass, Clegg (a.k.a. Mt. Moriah), Collings, Dieterlen Grave, Dietz, Forest Grove (a.k.a. Willey's Chapel), Guernsey, Henryville, Hylton-Condrey, Hosea Family, Kaylor-Wilcox, Little Union (a.k.a. Gross), McBride-Allen-Biggs (a.k.a. Allen), Mt. Lebanon, Mt. Moriah, Mt. Zion, Otisco II, St. Clair, St. Francis Catholic (a.k.a. Henryville Catholic), Tuttle, and Wootan.

References
 United States Census Bureau cartographic boundary files
 U.S. Board on Geographic Names

External links

 Indiana Township Association
 United Township Association of Indiana

Townships in Clark County, Indiana
Townships in Indiana